CJCY may refer to:

 CJCY-FM, a radio station (102.1 FM) licensed to Medicine Hat, Alberta, Canada
 CFMY-FM, a radio station (96.1 FM) licensed to Medicine Hat, Alberta, Canada, which held the call sign CJCY from 1982 to 1998